The 1994 Oklahoma state elections were held on November 8, 1994. The primary election was held on July 26. The runoff primary election was held August 23. The 1994 elections marked the first time in state history that Republicans held a majority of the Statewide elected offices: 7 out of 11. It also marked the first time Republicans controlled both the offices of Governor and Lieutenant Governor at the same time.

Overview

Executive Branch Before Election

Legislature Before Election

Executive Branch After Election

Legislature After Election

See also
1994 Oklahoma gubernatorial election
Government of Oklahoma
Oklahoma House of Representatives
Oklahoma Senate
Politics of Oklahoma
Oklahoma's congressional districts

 
Oklahoma House of Representatives elections
Oklahoma Senate elections
Oklahoma